Bennion is a surname. Notable people with the surname include:

 Alan Bennion (1930–2018), actor, portrayed Ice Lords in Doctor Who
 Chris Bennion (born 1980), Scottish-born footballer, who has mainly played for clubs in Ireland
Francis Bennion (1923-2015), English barrister and author of texts on statutory interpretation
 Fred Bennion (1884–1960), American college sports coach
 Lowell L. Bennion (1907–1996), American educator
 Mervyn S. Bennion (1887–1941), American naval officer who died at Pearl Harbour
 Milton Bennion (1870–1953), American educator
 Phil Bennion (born 1954), British politician
 Ray Bennion (1896–1968), Welsh footballer
 Sam Bennion (1871–1941), British footballer
 Stan Bennion (1938–2013), British footballer